The Săsar is a right tributary of the river Lăpuș in Maramureș County, Romania. It discharges into the Lăpuș in Bozânta Mare, southwest of Baia Mare. It is a medium-size river which flows through the cities of Baia Sprie and Baia Mare.

The river was heavily polluted with untreated sewage, agricultural fertilizer, and toxic chemicals from local mining sites, including cyanide, arsenic, lead, and cadmium.  One notable incident occurred on January 30, 2000, when a tailings impoundment at the Baia Mare mine burst, releasing 50 to 100 tons of cyanide and heavy metals into the river.  The Săsar, locally known as the "dead river," is unsuitable for bathing, washing, or fishing.  The World Health Organization has identified the Baia Mare region as a "health risk hotspot."

The Săsar flows into the Lăpuș, which in turn flows into the Someș, a tributary of the Danube via the Tisza. Pollution in the Săsar thus eventually reaches Romania, Hungary, Serbia, and Bulgaria.

Tributaries

The following rivers are tributaries to the river Săsar:

Right: Chiuzbaia, Firiza, Usturoi, Borcut

References

External links 

 United Nations report on cyanide spill from the Baia Mare mine

Rivers of Romania
Rivers of Maramureș County
Baia Mare